No. 139 (Jamaica) Squadron RAF was a Royal Air Force Squadron that was fighter unit in World War I and a bomber unit from World War II until the 1960s.

History

Formation and World War I
No. 139 Squadron Royal Air Force was formed on 3 July 1918 at Villaverla in Italy and was equipped with Bristol F2b fighter aircraft. It was disbanded on 7 March 1919.

Reformation and World War II

The squadron reformed on 3 September 1936 at Wyton, equipped first with Hawker Hinds and then Bristol Blenheims. On 3 September 1939 a Blenheim IV of the squadron piloted by Andrew McPherson was the first British aircraft to cross the German coast after Britain had declared war on Germany. On 4 September 1939, Nos. 110, 107 and 139 Squadrons led the first RAF air raid of the war against German shipping near Wilhelmshaven. In December 1939, the squadron was moved to Betheniville, France and in May 1940 when based at Plivot it was overrun by the German advance and lost most of its aircraft.

A Jamaican newspaper started a fund to buy bombers for Britain and in recognition of money raised to buy Blenheims it was decided to link Jamaica with a squadron of the Royal Air Force, hence the "Jamaica" tag given to the squadron. In December 1941, the squadron converted to the Lockheed Hudson aircraft, which it operated in Burma until April 1942.

In June 1942, the squadron returned to England and re-equipped with the Blenheim V before quickly switching to the de Havilland Mosquito at Horsham St. Faith. On 3 March, it carried out a daring air raid on the molybdenum processing plant at Knaben in Norway.  It is believed that this was one of the raids on which the fictional work 633 Squadron was based. As a result of this raid a number of flight crew received decorations.  On 20 March, the squadron lost a number of aircraft a week before the official announcement of the decorations.

It became part of the pathfinder force in July 1943 and remained so for the remainder of the war.

Post War 
The squadron equipped with the English Electric Canberra B2 at RAF Hemswell beginning in November 1952. It disbanded on 31 December 1959 and reformed again at RAF Wittering on 1 January 1962 with the Handley Page Victor B2, before it was finally disbanded on 31 December 1968.

Aircraft operated

See also
Kenneth Tempest

References

Notes

Bibliography

External links

 History of No.'s 136–140 Squadrons at RAF Web
 139 Squadron history on official RAF website
 IWM Interview with RAF officer Edward Sismore

https://kenfentonswar.com/ Pilot training and flying Blenheim's with 139 Squadron

139
Military units and formations established in 1918
1918 establishments in the United Kingdom
Bomber squadrons of the Royal Air Force in World War II